David Morton may refer to:
 David Morton (poet) (1886–1957), American poet
 David Morton (rugby union) (1861–1937), Scottish rugby union player
 David Bruce Morton (born 1959), American serial killer and rapist
 Dave Morton (born 1953), English motorcycle speedway rider